is a passenger railway station located in the city of Ōtsu, Shiga Prefecture, Japan, operated by the private railway company Keihan Electric Railway.  It is located adjacent to the JR West Zeze Station, but the two stations are not physically connected and there is no interchange between stations.

Lines

Station layout
The station consists of two opposed unnumbered side platforms connected by a level crossing.  The station is unattended.

Platforms

Adjacent stations

History
The station was renamed  on August 20, 1937. It was renamed to its present name on April 1, 1953.

Passenger statistics
In fiscal 2018, the station was used by an average of 2762 passengers daily (boarding passengers only).

Surrounding area
Gichū-ji, National Historic Site
Shiga Prefectural Otsu High School
Otsu Municipal Hirano Elementary School

See also
List of railway stations in Japan

References

External links

Keihan official home page

Railway stations in Shiga Prefecture
Stations of Keihan Electric Railway
Railway stations in Japan opened in 1913
Railway stations in Ōtsu